The 2002 Notre Dame Fighting Irish football team represented the University of Notre Dame in the 2002 NCAA Division I-A football season. The team was coached by Tyrone Willingham and played its home games at Notre Dame Stadium in South Bend, Indiana.

Season overview
The 2002 season became known as a "Return to Glory" for the Irish. This phrase appeared on a student shirt that created a "Sea of Green" in the Irish stands. It was picked up by many in the media and was used on the front cover of Sports Illustrated. Despite not scoring an offensive touchdown in their first two games, the Irish won both, and in the process made Willingham the 24th Notre Dame head coach to win his opener in his first season. The team went on to win its next six games, including wins over Willingham's alma mater, Michigan State, and Stanford, his former team.

The team was initially led throughout the season by quarterback Carlyle Holiday, former quarterback and wide receiver Arnaz Battle, and on defense, Shane Walton. Running back Ryan Grant, who had to replace Julius Jones who was out for academic reasons, also played an important role. During the Michigan State game, however, Holiday was injured and replaced by backup Pat Dillingham. Dillingham led the Irish to a comeback win on a screen pass to Battle in that game, and he continued the winning streak until Holiday returned for the Florida State game. In that game, Holiday threw a 65-yard touchdown on his first play to Battle that helped the Irish win the game.

The first Irish loss of the season came against the Boston College Eagles, mirroring the 1993 season when Notre Dame narrowly lost a chance to participate in the national championship game due to a loss to Boston College. Willingham, wanting the team to be a part of the "Sea of Green" in the stands, decided that the team should wear green for the game. In 1985, the last time the Irish wore green at home, they came out after halftime against USC and won the game 37–3. The ploy, however, did not work this time, as, after an injured Holiday was replaced by Dillingham, and the Eagles defense returned an interception that sealed the loss for the Irish.

The Fighting Irish won their next two games, including their 39th straight victory over Navy and a 42–0 blowout victory over struggling Rutgers. This gave Notre Dame a legitimate shot at a Bowl Championship Series (BCS) bowl game if they could win against perennial rival USC. The Irish were ranked higher than the Trojans, but USC quarterback Carson Palmer, who cited the game as the reason he went on to win the Heisman Trophy, threw for 425 yards in the Trojans' 31 point win. The Irish won 10 games but were not invited to a BCS bowl game, and they accepted a bid to play North Carolina State in the  instead. With both an offense and defense that outmatched the Irish, the Wolfpack won the game 28–6, giving the Irish their sixth consecutive bowl loss. Despite the loss, the Irish ended the season ranked in both the Associated Press (AP) and Coaches Polls.

After the season, some Irish were honored with post-season awards. Battle was named by one foundation as their sportsman of the year, while Walton was named as a Consensus All-American. Finally, Willingham was honored with two Coach of the Year awards, was named by Sporting News as "Sportsman of the Year", and was the only coach listed by Sporting News as one of their "Most Powerful People in Sports".

Schedule

Roster

Rankings

Game summaries

at Florida State

at USC

vs. NC State (Gator Bowl)

Source:

Team players in the NFL

References

Notre Dame
Notre Dame Fighting Irish football seasons
Notre Dame Fighting Irish football